Makadi Bay is a resort town in Egypt. It is located about 30 kilometers south of Hurghada on the Red Sea. The resort is surrounded by the Egyptian Eastern Desert.
The bay is known for its sand beaches and crystal-clear water.

Tourism 
Makadi Bay is known for its turquoise waters and beautiful desert landscape.

Red Sea Riviera

References

External links
Makadi Bay Egypt Guide

Red Sea Riviera